The Australian Football League's 2008 Finals Series determined the top eight final positions of the 2008 AFL season. It began on the weekend of 5 September 2008 and ended with the 112th AFL Grand Final at the Melbourne Cricket Ground on 27 September 2008. The Hawthorn Football Club were crowned the 2008 AFL Premiers, beating the Geelong Football Club by 26 points in front of a crowd of 100,012.

The eight teams qualified for the finals series by finishing in the top eight positions of the premiership ladder at the completion of the home and away series.

Ladder

With twenty-one wins and one loss Geelong continued from its crushing 2007 season to dominate the home and away rounds of 2008.

Summary of results

The finals system 

The system is a final eight system. This system is different from the McIntyre final eight system, which was previously used by the AFL.

The top four teams in the eight receive what is popularly known as the "double chance" when they play in week-one qualifying finals; this means that if a top-four team loses in the first week, it still has a chance to redeem itself by getting a chance to play in a semi-final the next week against the winner of an elimination final. The bottom four of the eight are forced to play what are called elimination finals, in which only the winners survive and move on to week two to play the losers of the qualifying finals.

In the second week, the winners of the qualifying finals receive a bye to the third week, while the losers of those qualifying finals must play the winners of the elimination finals for a chance to play the qualifying finals winners. Home-city advantage goes to the team with the higher seed in the first two weeks, and the qualifying final winners in the third week, with games in Victoria played at the MCG, regardless of the team's usual home ground.

In the third week, the winners of the semi-finals from week two play the winners of the qualifying finals in the first week, with the latter receiving home-ground advantage. The winners of those matches move on to the Grand Final at the Melbourne Cricket Ground in Melbourne, where the new premier will be crowned.

Week One

First Qualifying Final (Geelong vs. St Kilda)

St Kilda finished in 4th spot on the AFL Ladder after thrashing Essendon by 108 points in the final regular season match. They entered this match with the double chance and were beaten by 58 points. Onballer Lenny Hayes was booked for striking Geelong's Joel Selwood in the third quarter, a report that was later dropped. Geelong earned a bye and home preliminary final with its win, whilst St Kilda was forced to face Collingwood, a team that they had twice lost to in the regular season, in a semi-final.

Second Qualifying Final (Hawthorn vs. Western Bulldogs) 

For much of the second half of the season, Hawthorn and the Western Bulldogs looked certain to finish second and third (in some order), setting up this particular qualifying final; Hawthorn would ultimately be the home team after the Bulldogs' late-season form dropped. Hawthorn won the match comfortably, with Lance Franklin kicking eight goals (the most ever in a final by a Hawthorn player) to earn a week's break, whilst the Western Bulldogs were forced to host the Sydney Swans, whom they had beaten twice during the year, in a semi-final.

First Elimination Final (Adelaide vs. Collingwood) 

Two teams who were early-season top-four candidates were playing for survival in this elimination final played at AAMI Stadium on a fine 26 degree C day. Collingwood started slight favorites and led early in the match but Adelaide got its game going, with a season's best second quarter, to lead at half-time before quickly falling behind for good during a second half collapse. For the second year in succession, Adelaide were eliminated the first week of the finals, whilst Collingwood went on to face St Kilda in a semi-final at the Melbourne Cricket Ground.

Second Elimination Final (Sydney vs. North Melbourne) 

These two teams were clashing in a final for the first time since the 1996 AFL Grand Final, which was won by North Melbourne by 43 points. Sydney entered this match having won only three matches since Round 13, but, after a slow start and an ordinary first half, they got on with the job and ended the Kangaroos' season. It was also the last game for retiring Kangaroo and ex-Swan Shannon Grant. The Swans won the right to face the Western Bulldogs the next week at the Melbourne Cricket Ground, where they had not won a final since the 2005 AFL Grand Final.

Most controversially, the crowd for this game was a very low 19,127. The AFL attributed the poor turnout to several factors, including high ticket prices, the bad weather (it was raining heavily, and had been doing so for several days) and North Melbourne's lack of popularity in Sydney (where they had once played home games). However, it also attracted heavy commentary in the media and public against the viability of the AFL's decision to base its 18th franchise in Western Sydney.

Week Two

First semi-final (St Kilda vs. Collingwood)

Collingwood came into the game as favourites to defeat St Kilda, who had been on the end of a heavy defeat at the hands of Geelong the week prior, and whom they had beaten twice during the year. St Kilda led by just three points at quarter time but kicked ten goals to Collingwood's two in the middle two quarters to take a 40-point lead going into the final quarter. Justin Koschitzke was reported for a dump tackle involving Shane Wakelin, but the charge was later dismissed. St Kilda progressed to play Hawthorn in the preliminary final, hoping to atone for two previous preliminary final losses (2004 and 2005) to make the grand final.

Second semi-final (Western Bulldogs vs. Sydney) 

Sydney held a one-point lead at quarter time, but failed to score a major in the third quarter, and fell apart to lose by 37 points, thus ending their season at the semi-finals stage. Fullback Leo Barry was booked for striking Shaun Higgins but the report was thrown out. The Western Bulldogs were drawn to play defending premier Geelong in the preliminary final to battle for a Grand Final berth.

Week Three

First Preliminary Final (Geelong vs. Western Bulldogs) 

Geelong progressed to their second straight Grand Final but had to, for the second year in succession, withstand a late challenge from their preliminary final opponent. The Western Bulldogs had much of the play, but missed shots on goal in the second half when they were available. This was the Western Bulldogs's furthest finish in a season since 1998, when they made back-to-back preliminary finals.

Second Preliminary Final (Hawthorn vs. St Kilda)

Hawthorn defied a poor recent record against the Saints to post one of their best wins of the season, with strong performances by much of the team making up for Coleman Medallist Lance Franklin being kept to a single goal by Saints backman Max Hudghton. The loss was the 383rd and last game for St Kilda's Robert Harvey who left the game as the most capped player without an AFL premiership.

Week Four

Grand Final (Geelong vs. Hawthorn) 

 

Hawthorn surprise the minor premiers Geelong to come away with there 10th premiership to win by 26 points in a match that was played in front of 100,012 people on a warm 27°C afternoon. The Cats kicked 23 behinds for the match, some which deliberately done by the Hawks.

Luke Hodge won the Norm Smith Medal as best afield while teammates Shane Crawford retired after playing 306 games and Trent Croad would ultimately would also play his last game after 222 games after breaking his foot during the game.

See also 
2008 AFL season

Notes and references

External links
 AFL official website
 RealFooty by The Age (Melbourne) Online 
 SportsAustralia (news and views)

AFL Finals Series
Finals Series